Matthew Knowles (born October 8, 1974) is an American professional wrestler, better known by his ring name H. C. Loc. He is perhaps best known for his tenure in Ring of Honor, where he is a one time World Tag Team Champion with Tony DeVito as a part of The Carnage Crew.

Professional wrestling career

Early career (1996–1999)
After watching a television advertisement for "Crunchers Gym", a professional wrestling school operated by Bob Bailey, Knowles decided to enroll in order to become a professional wrestler. Despite being uncertain as to whether or not he would be accepted into the school, given that he was exceptionally small for a professional wrestler in the mid-1990s, Knowles contacted Bailey and was admitted to the school. He would then train under Bailey and T.C. Reynolds for six days a week over the course of fifteen months.

After taking part in several tag team matches and battle royals, he wrestled his first singles match on August 8, 1996 against Steve Corino in Bailey's own promotion. Knowles originally wrestled under his own name, but later renamed himself to H. C. Loc. The "H. C." stood for "Hard Core" (as in hardcore music, not hardcore wrestling).

From 1996 to 1999, Knowles wrestled on the independent circuit in the northeast, appearing on occasion as an enhancement talent with World Championship Wrestling and the World Wrestling Federation. Knowles also competed in the WWF's first-ever intergender match on the April 6, 1998 edition of Raw against Luna, but lost.

Extreme Championship Wrestling (1999–2001)
In the summer of 1999, Knowles attended a training seminar held by Dory Funk Jr. in Ocala, Florida. Funk arranged for Knowles to have a try-out match with Extreme Championship Wrestling, which he wrestled the next week in Queens, New York. Knowles was hired by ECW on the basis of the match, and originally worked as a member of the ECW ring crew, constructing and dismantling the ring before and after shows. He also acted as a referee who wrestled on occasions. Like many other ECW employees, Knowles received several bounced paychecks as owner Paul Heyman's debts began to spiral out of control.

Ring of Honor (2002–2005)

Knowles debuted on the inaugural ROH show, Era of Honor Begins, on February 23, 2002 as a referee. On April 27, Knowles formed a tag team with his longtime friend DeVito known as The Carnage Crew. The Carnage Crew was later expanded to include Masada and then again to include Justin Credible. Credible left ROH in 2004, while Masada turned against Knowles and DeVito on May 22, 2004. After briefly feuding with Special K, the Carnage Crew began feuding Dan Maff and B. J. Whitmer. After Maff left ROH, they began feuding with Whitmer and his new partner Jimmy Jacobs. On July 9, 2005, The Carnage Crew defeated Whitmer and Jacobs for the Tag Team Championship. Only a few weeks later at The Hoemcoming, the Carnage Crew re-lost the title to Whitmer and Jacobs on July 23. On August 20 at Night of the Grudges II, the Carnage Crew wrestled their final match in ROH and lost to The Ring Crew Express. After leaving ROH, Knowles took a hiatus from wrestling.

Return to wrestling (2008–2011)
On January 25, 2008, the National Wrestling Alliance territory NWA Upstate announced that after a three-year-long hiatus,  Knowles, under his H. C. Loc ring name, would be returning to their promotion on February 23, 2008 to compete at their event February Fallout. At the event, Loc teamed with Eric Everlast to defeat Super Assassin and Triple X. Later on in the year, he teamed with Cody Deaner to defeat Kid Justice and Rik Matrix on the September 7 episode of Pier 6 Wrestling's Shakedown television show. On April 4, 2009, Loc lost to Nunzio at an Independent Superstars of Professional Wrestling event.

On July 10, 2010 at Acid-Fest: A Tribute to Trent Acid, Loc and DeVito reunited and reformed the Carnage Crew and wrestled in a four-way tag team match also involving the H8 Club and Da Hit Squad, which was ultimately won by The S.A.T.

Capitol Wrestling (2019-Present)

Championships and accomplishments
Eastern States Wrestling
ESW Cruiserweight Championship (1 time)
New Breed Wrestling
NBW Cruiserweight Championship (1 time)
New Era Pro Wrestling
NEPW North Coast Championship (1 time)
Nickel City Wrestling
NCW Heavyweight Championship (1 time, current)
NWA Upstate/Upstate Pro Wrestling
NWA Upstate / UPW Heavyweight Championship (2 times)
Pro Wrestling Illustrated
PWI ranked him #303 of the top 500 singles wrestlers in the PWI 500 in 2003
Ring of Honor
ROH Tag Team Championship (1 time) – with Tony DeVito
Ultimate Wrestling
UW Heavyweight Championship (1 time)
United States Wrestling Federation
USWF Light Heavyweight Championship (1 time)
World of Hurt Wrestling
WOHW Heavyweight Championship (1 time)
WOHW Tag Team Championship (1 time) – with Danger
WOHW United States Championship (2 times)
Other titles
AWA Cruiserweight Championship (1 time)

References

Interview with Todd Brantley
Interview with Dan Ottman

External links
The Official Website of Loc & Devito the Carnage Crew
The official website of H. C. Loc

1974 births
American male professional wrestlers
Living people
People from Elmira, New York
Professional wrestlers from New York (state)
Professional wrestling referees
ROH World Tag Team Champions
20th-century professional wrestlers
21st-century professional wrestlers